Mound Prairie Township may refer to the following townships in the United States:

 Mound Prairie Township, Jasper County, Iowa
 Mound Prairie Township, Houston County, Minnesota